Bethlehem is a populated place in Caroline County, Maryland, United States. Bethlehem is located at the intersection of Maryland routes 331 and 578, northwest of Preston.

History
Bethlehem dates far back as 1875, when a U.S Post Office was established as Bethlehem P.O. According to the USGS, the post office was established in 1857.

Notable person
William Oswald Mills (August 12, 1924 – May 24, 1973), aka Bill Mills, was a Republican U.S. congressman who represented the 1st Congressional district of Maryland from May 25, 1971, until his death. Mills was born in Bethlehem.

References

Unincorporated communities in Caroline County, Maryland
Unincorporated communities in Maryland